Salusbury Manners Mellor (16 September 1862 – 26 June 1917) was a British sailor who competed in the 1900 Summer Olympics in Paris, France. Mellor took the 5th place in the 10 to 20 ton.

References

External links

 

1862 births
1917 deaths
British male sailors (sport)
Sailors at the 1900 Summer Olympics – 10 to 20 ton
Olympic sailors of Great Britain
People from Cardington, Bedfordshire
Sportspeople from Bedford